Nathanallur is a small village in Walajabad taluk, Kanchipuram district, Tamil Nadu, India. Tamil Nadu state highway 48 is passing through Nathanallur village. Nathanallur is  distance from its Walajabad taluk and town,  distance from its district main city Kanchipuram and  distance from its state main city Chennai.

History of Nathanallur 
The village people believes that the name Nathanallur originated by the great poetiser Mr. Nanthanar. Nathanallur also have a sub village called Madura Nallur popularly known as Nellur. Nellur people basically migrated from Nathanallur in the early stage to cultivate their far distance lands.

Festivals in Nathanallur 
There are many temples in Nathanallur. Carnivals are celebrated for each temple in different periods.

List of popularly known temple are below. 
 Ellamman Temple
 Perumal Temple
 Many Vinayakar Temples
 Gangaiamman Temple
 Durgaiamman Temple
 Selliamman Temple
 Adanjiamman Temple 
 Periyandavar Temple and many more.

Sri Devi Ellamman Temple 

Every year Tamil month Chithirai first amavasya, a famous 10 days great festival called Float Festival is celebrated for Ellamman.
The first nine days Lord is beautifully decorated with ornament and flowers to ride around the village in the "Bullock Cart" with different avatar in each day to show this avatars to the village pilgrims.

The carnival is very grand on the 10th day i.e. on amavasya. All village people with their relatives from nearby cities & towns gather near the theppakulam at Ellamman temple. Lord Sri Devi Ellamman is beautifully decorated with ornament and flowers. And amman swing on the oonjal then the lord is transfer to a floating boat to circle around the Theppakulam on wonderful night with colourful crackers. The joyful carnival ends on the next day with stage drama.
Also there are many other Hindu spiritual activities will happen on the entire day. Do not miss this great carnival.

Float Festival Gallery

Bramma Urchavangal

Other Festivals 
Likewise, Tamil Aadi month Koozh ( - One of the great south Indian food) will be served to their neighborhoods and relatives during Gangaiamman & Bommayi amman temple festival.

And many other festivals for Vinayakar, Perumal and Adanjiamman temples.

Education 

Panchayat Union School is established by 1923s. In 2006 the school got certification and the name is converted into Panchayat Union Middle School.

As of 2011 India census, Nathanallur had a population of 2158. Males constitute 48.5% of the population and females 51.5%. Nathanallur has an average literacy rate of 67.8%, higher than the national average of 59.5%: male literacy is 73.9%, and female literacy is 61.9%. In Nathanallur, 12% of the population is under 6 years of age.

Transportation 

Village people will get everything from the nearby town Walajabad. Therefore, most of them having two wheeler. However, Few people depending on the public transport. There is no specific public transport for Nathanallur. But people will get the public bus on junction (Nathanallur Koot road) at SH 48 where route 79 and 579A buses are available at every 10 minutes interval.
Walajabad is the only near by railway station for local Trains.

Route List 

Legend: HF- High Frequency Route, NS – Night Service Route, LF – Low Frequency Route

Profession 
Most of the village people are land lards and Koolis. Agriculture is the main day-to-day work for the village people. But nowadays the agriculture is drastically coming down and real estate business is dominating in the people mind.

Religions 
90% of the village peoples are Hindu and remaining peoples are recently being converted to Christians.

Place of Worship
 Dhuraimurugar Siva Marabu Sithaandha Dhiyana Sabai, http://www.templedivinesuccess.com

Villages & Towns Near By Nathanallur

Colleges near by Nathanallur 
 Lord Venkateswaraa Engineering College, Puliambakkam
 Adhi College of Engineering and Technology, Sankarapuram
 Esenes Institute of Teacher Education, Walajabad
 Cholan Teacher Training Institute, Sambarambakkam
 Amirtham Institute of Management Studies, Walajabad

Residential Projects 
  Inno GeoCity, Thenneri
 ADHAM properties in MADURANALLUR : //www.adhamproperties.com

References

External links 
 Nathanallur location in wikimapia
 Nathanallur location in Google Map

Villages in Kanchipuram district